Pelican Bay is a census-designated place (CDP) in Collier County, Florida, United States. The population was 6,346 at the 2010 census. It is part of the Naples–Marco Island Metropolitan Statistical Area.

Geography
It is part of the area known as North Naples and is located just south of Naples Park and west of Pine Ridge. It is bordered to the south by the city of Naples, to the east by U.S. Route 41 (the Tamiami Trail), to the north by Vanderbilt Beach Road, and to the west by the Gulf of Mexico.

Demographics

2020 census

As of the 2020 United States census, there were 6,660 people, 3,483 households, and 2,165 families residing in the CDP.

2000 census
As of the census of 2000, there were 5,686 people, 3,005 households, and 2,166 families residing in the CDP. The racial makeup of the CDP was 99.21% White, 0.09% African American, 0.04% Native American, 0.47% Asian, 0.07% from other races, and 0.12% from two or more races. Hispanic or Latino of any race were 0.91% of the population.

There were 3,005 households, out of which 3.5% had children under the age of 18 living with them, 70.0% were married couples living together, 1.5% had a female householder with no husband present, and 27.9% were non-families. 25.6% of all households were made up of individuals, and 16.6% had someone living alone who was 65 years of age or older.  The average household size was 1.84 and the average family size was 2.12.

In the CDP, the population was spread out, with 3.4% under the age of 18, 0.7% from 18 to 24, 4.2% from 25 to 44, 33.9% from 45 to 64, and 57.8% who were 65 years of age or older.  The median age was 67 years. For every 100 females, there were 84.5 males.  For every 100 females age 18 and over, there were 84.0 males.

The median income for a household in the CDP was $102,762, and the median income for a family was $127,920. Males had a median income of $100,000 versus $44,286 for females. The per capita income for the CDP was $89,063.  About 1.9% of families and 2.8% of the population were below the poverty line, including none of those under age 18 and 1.6% of those age 65 or over.

References

Census-designated places in Collier County, Florida
Census-designated places in Florida
Populated coastal places in Florida on the Gulf of Mexico
Planned communities in Florida